Can Baró is a neighborhood in the Horta-Guinardó district of Barcelona, Catalonia (Spain).

Neighbourhoods of Barcelona
Horta-Guinardó